Unnai Kann Theduthey is a 2000 Indian Tamil-language drama film, directed by Sundar C, starring Sathyaraj, Khushbu, Livingston and Ravali. The film was released in 2000.

Cast

Sathyaraj as Vichu
Khushbu as Vaidehi
Livingston as Prabhu
Ravali as Gayathri
Manivannan
Senthil
Vivek
Mansoor Ali Khan
Kovai Sarala
Jai Ganesh
Delhi Ganesh
Madhan Bob
R. Sundarrajan 
 Tharika
Sachu
Sukumari
Manya
Sathyapriya
Balu Anand
Thalapathy Dinesh
Mayilsamy
Vijayakumar

Songs
Music was composed by Deva. Lyrics were written by Pazhani Bharathi, Kalaikumar and Pa. Vijay.

References

2000 films
2000s Tamil-language films
Films directed by Sundar C.
Films scored by Deva (composer)
Indian thriller drama films
Films about Indian weddings
2000 thriller drama films
2000 drama films